Elbe Germanic, also called Irminonic or Erminonic, is a term introduced by the German linguist Friedrich Maurer (1898–1984) in his book, Nordgermanen und Alemanen, to describe the unattested proto-language, or dialectal grouping, ancestral to the later Lombardic, Alemannic,  Bavarian and Thuringian dialects. During Late antiquity and the Middle Ages, its supposed descendants had a profound influence on the neighboring West Central German dialects and, later, in the form of Standard German, on the German language as a whole.

Nomenclature  
The term Irminonic is derived from the Irminones, a culturo-linguistic grouping of Germanic tribes that was mentioned by Tacitus in his Germania. Pliny the Elder further specified its meaning by claiming that the Irminones lived "in the interior", meaning not close to the Rhine or North Sea. Maurer used Pliny to refer to the dialects spoken by the Suevi, Bavarii, Alemanni and Lombards around the Hercynian Forest and the Northeastern German plain.

Theory 

Maurer asserted that the cladistic tree model, which was used ubiquitously in linguistics in the 19th and the early 20th centuries, was too inaccurate to describe the relation between the modern Germanic languages, especially those belonging to its Western branch. Rather than depicting Old English, Old Dutch, Old Saxon, Old Frisian and Old High German to have simply 'branched off' a single common 'Proto-West Germanic', which many previous linguists equated to "Old German / Urdeutsch", he assumed that there had been much more distance between certain dialectal groupings and proto-languages.

See also
North Sea Germanic 
Rhine-Weser Germanic

References

Bibliography 
 Grimm, Jacob (1835). Deutsche Mythologie (German Mythology); From English released version Grimm's Teutonic Mythology (1888); Available online by Northvegr © 2004–2007:Chapter 15, page 2-; 3. File retrieved 11-18-2015.
 Tacitus, Germania (1st century AD). (in Latin)  
 Friedrich Maurer (1942) Nordgermanen und Alemannen:  Studien zur germanische und frühdeutschen Sprachgeschichte, Stammes- und Volkskunde, Strasbourg:  Hünenburg.
 
 

Pre-Roman Iron Age
Suebi
Germanic languages
West Germanic languages